The 2012–13 season was the 86th season in ACF Fiorentina's history, their 75th season in Serie A, and the eighth consecutive season since promotion from Serie B in 2004. The club competed in Serie A, finishing fourth for the first time since the 2008–09 season, and in the 2012–13 edition in Coppa Italia, where they were eliminated in the quarter-finals.

In addition to the success of achieving fourth place, the season was also notable for the return of striker Luca Toni to the club, with whom he scored 31 goals in the 2005–06 season, winning the European Golden Shoe.

Players

Squad information
Last updated on 19 May 2013
Appearances include league matches only

Transfers

In

Out

Pre-season and friendlies

Competitions

Overall

Last updated: 19 May 2013

Serie A

League table

Results summary

Results by round

Matches

Coppa Italia

Statistics

Appearances and goals

|-
! colspan=10 style="background:#9400D3; color:#FFFFFF; text-align:center"| Goalkeepers

|-
! colspan=10 style="background:#9400D3; color:#FFFFFF; text-align:center"| Defenders

|-
! colspan=10 style="background:#9400D3; color:#FFFFFF; text-align:center"| Midfielders

|-
! colspan=10 style="background:#9400D3; color:#FFFFFF; text-align:center"| Forwards

|-
! colspan=10 style="background:#9400D3; color:#FFFFFF; text-align:center"| Players transferred out during the season

Goalscorers

Last updated: 19 May 2013

Clean sheets

Last updated: 19 May 2013

Disciplinary record

References

ACF Fiorentina seasons
Fiorentina